Mochtar Apin (23.Des.1923–01.Jan.1994) was an accomplished Indonesian painter and tenured lecturer.

He was co-founder of the Arena of Independent Artists movement (Gelanggang Seniman Muda ) in Jakarta in 1946, and a member of the Bandung Institute of Technology. Alongside other painters, intellectuals and poets, he advocated a universalist ideal for culture, advocating the creation of art concerns that could communicate to people of all backgrounds.

Life

In 1948, Apin enrolled at the Technical Faculty, Universitas Indonesia (renamed as Institut Teknologi Bandung (ITB) in 1959) where he became a student of Ries Mulder, one of the founders of the school. In 1951 he visitied The Netherlands on a scholarship to study at the Kunstnijverheidsschool Quellinus. Later in 1953 he enrolled at the École Nationale Supérieure des Beaux-Arts, the Fine Arts School in Paris. During these years, Mochtar took the initiative travelling around Europe, looking at art and visiting museums. Apin was a great admirer of the optical art of Victor Vasarely, having lived for several years in France. His geometric paintings from this period are related to the graphic work of Vasarely.

With these experiences, Mochtar was well equipped to debate on the role of art in Indonesia. 
Mochtar returned to Bandung  in 1958 and joined the teaching staff of his former Faculty one year prior to the departure of Ries Mulder. His last retrospective in 1988 was held in Bandung and Jakarta, four years after he received tenure as professor at the ITB.

In 1960, Mochtar married Sien Mochtar Apin, and the couple had three daughters, Karina, Arleti and Marella Mochtar Apin.

Works and Exhibitions

 Solo Exhibition in Amsterdam and Den Haag in 1953
 Solo Exhibition in Paris in 1956
 Solo Exhibition Bangkok, 1968, 1969 and 1971
 Solo Exhibition in Jakarta, Dewan Kesenian Jakarta in 1976
 Solo Exhibition "Retrospektif 1940-1988" in Bandung in 1986, Jakarta in 1989 and Yogyakarta in 1990
 Exhibition of Bandung Artists, 21–28 December 1986
 Cubism in Asia: Unbounded Dialogues organised by the Japan Foundation in 2004

Awards

 Scholarship from the Indonesian government to study at the cole Nationale Supérieure des Beaux-Arts, Paris, France (1953-1957)
 Scholarship from Deutsche Akademie der Künste, Berlin, West Germany (1957-1958)
 Scholarship from France to study lithography/offset/ printmaking techniques in Paris (1968)
 Cultural Award from the Australian government (1974)

See also
 Abdul Djalil Pirous
 Ahmad Sadali
 I Nyoman Masriadi
 Ries Mulder
 Umi Dachlan

References

1923 births
1994 deaths
20th-century Indonesian painters
Abstract expressionist artists
Academic staff of Bandung Institute of Technology
Bandung Institute of Technology alumni